The Crawford County Courthouse is located in Prairie du Chien, Wisconsin.

History
The courthouse was built with dolomitic limestone quarried in Bridgeport, Wisconsin. The basement was originally a jail that likely predated the rest of the building. It was used as such until 1896, when a separate building was completed. The courthouse was listed on the National Register of Historic Places in 1982, and on the State Register of Historic Places in 1989.

References

Courthouses on the National Register of Historic Places in Wisconsin
National Register of Historic Places in Crawford County, Wisconsin
Colonial Revival architecture in Wisconsin
Italianate architecture in Wisconsin
Georgian Revival architecture in Wisconsin
Limestone buildings in the United States
Government buildings completed in 1868